Michal Dobroň (born September 29, 1979) is a Czech professional ice hockey defenceman who is currently a free agent.

Dobroň previously played in the Czech Extraliga for HC Sparta Praha, HC Karlovy Vary and HC Plzeň as well as the Tipsport Liga in Slovakia for HC Slovan Bratislava before joining the Edinburgh Capitals of the United Kingdom's Elite Ice Hockey League in 2012. He stayed for two seasons before joining Pingouins de Morzine-Avoriaz of the French Ligue Magnus.

Having not playing during the 2015–16 season, Dobroň returned to the Edinburgh Capitals as player-coach in May 2016 ahead of the 2016-17 season. He departed in May 2017, taking up the position of player-assistant coach with Brest.

References

External links

1979 births
Brest Albatros Hockey players
Czech ice hockey defencemen
HC Karlovy Vary players
Edinburgh Capitals players
Living people
HC Morzine-Avoriaz players
HC Plzeň players
HC Slovan Bratislava players
HC Sparta Praha players
Ice hockey people from Prague
Czech expatriate ice hockey people
Czech expatriate sportspeople in Scotland
Expatriate ice hockey players in Scotland
Expatriate ice hockey players in France
Czech expatriate sportspeople in France